is a railway station in the ward of Fushimi, city of Kyoto, Kyoto Prefecture, Japan.

Lines
Kintetsu Railway
Kyoto Line

Fushimi-Momoyama Station on the Keihan Main Line and Momoyama Station on the JR Nara Line are within walking distance from Momoyamagoryō-mae Station.

Layout
The elevated station has two platforms and two tracks.

Platforms

History
1928 - The station opens as a station of Nara Electric Railroad
1963 - NER merges and the station becomes part of Kintetsu
2007 - Starts using PiTaPa

Adjacent stations

References

External links

 Station Facilities and Service
 Station Map

Railway stations in Kyoto
Railway stations in Japan opened in 1928